Green Cargo AB is a Swedish state-owned logistics company transporting various types of goods by train. It was created on 1 January 2001 out of the logistics division of Swedish State Railways (SJ) and became a government-owned limited company.

Green Cargo operates SJ Rc-class locomotives; 42  Class Rc2 have been refurbished and upgraded to "Rd2" class by Bombardier Transportation. Green Cargo has purchased 16 Bombardier Traxx locomotives, named Re by Green Cargo, and 8 Softronic Transmontana named Mb by Green Cargo.

Gallery

See also 
 SJ AB - public transport
 SeaRail - part-owned by Green Cargo; operating freight waggons between Sweden and Finland

References

External links 

Green Cargo - Official site

Government-owned companies of Sweden
Railway companies of Sweden
Privately held companies of Sweden
Swedish companies established in 2001
Railway companies established in 2001
Companies based in Solna Municipality